is a railway station on the Hakodate Main Line in Atsubetsu-ku, Sapporo, Hokkaido, Japan, operated by Hokkaido Railway Company (JR Hokkaido). The station is numbered "A05".

The station takes its name from the Nopporo Shinrin Kōen Prefectural Natural Park, located 20 minutes' walking distance from the station.

Lines
Shinrin-Kōen Station is served by the Hakodate Main Line.

Station layout
The station consists of two side platforms serving two tracks. The station has automated ticket machines, automated turnstiles which accept Kitaca, and a "Midori no Madoguchi" staffed ticket office.

Platforms

Adjacent stations

History
Shinrin-Kōen Station opened on 20 September 1984.

Surrounding area
 Nopporo Shinrin Kōen Prefectural Natural Park
 Centennial Memorial Tower
 Historical Village of Hokkaido
 Hokkaido Museum
  (to Asahikawa)
 Atsubetsu Shinrin-Kōen Police Station
 Shinrin-Kōen Station Post Office
 Shilla Shinrin-Kōen onsen

See also
 List of railway stations in Japan
 Shinrinkōen Station (Saitama), a similarly named station on the Tobu Tojo Line in Saitama Prefecture

References

External links

 JR Hokkaido Shinrin-Kōen Station map 

Railway stations in Japan opened in 1894
Railway stations in Sapporo